SofTech, Inc. was a computer software company with offices in the United States and headquarters established in Lowell, Massachusetts. SofTech was a significant provider of software engineering tools and solutions in the 1970's as well as Product Lifecycle Management, Product Data Management, and CAD CAM solutions. SofTech was founded by Douglas T. Ross, and was acquired by Essig PLM
.

References 

Software companies based in Massachusetts
Software companies established in 1969
1969 establishments in Massachusetts
Companies based in Lowell, Massachusetts
Companies traded over-the-counter in the United States
Defunct software companies of the United States